The Hawk Stone is a neolithic standing stone just north of the hamlet of Dean, Oxfordshire, England on Diddly Squat Farm belonging to Jeremy Clarkson. He has since named a lager made by him and the Cotswolds Brew Co. after the stone standing next to the field where the barley is grown for the lager.

Name
The name either derives from its shape, being like a hawk, or is a corruption of the word 'hoar' meaning 'old'.

Description
The Hawk Stone stands on Spelsbury Down, 900 metres west of Spelsburydown Farm. The stone stands to a height of 2.6 metres, and it has a width of approximately 1 metre by 0.9 metres at its base and tapers to 0.9 metres at the apex. It is made from oolitic limestone. A concave hollow in its upper face is known to have been worn over time by people rubbing the stone for luck, although it may originally have been natural in origin.

In legend
Local tradition has it that the cleft in the top of the stone was made by the chains of witches who were tied to the stone and burnt alive.

Hawkstone Lager
In 2022, Jeremy Clarkson launched his new lager. He named the lager after the Hawk stone.

References

Stone Age sites in England
Buildings and structures in Oxfordshire
History of Oxfordshire
Megalithic monuments in England
Archaeological sites in Oxfordshire
West Oxfordshire District